The Business Partner Network (BPN) is the single source for vendor data for the United States Federal Government.

External links
bpn.gov - Official site.

Federal government of the United States